KMWS (89.7 FM) is a radio station licensed to Mount Vernon, Washington. The station is owned by Washington State University, and airs Northwest Public Broadcasting's news and talk programming, consisting of syndicated programming from NPR, APM and PRX, as well as locally produced offerings.

History

The current 89.7 license began life as KSVR, the radio station of Skagit Valley College, on May 4, 1973.

In August 1996, Bellingham's public radio station, KZAZ, had applied to build a new FM station in Mount Vernon at 91.7 FM to expand its coverage area. This application would prove particularly useful for Washington State University after Northern Sound merged with Northwest Public Radio in 1997. KSVR at 90.1 was causing co-channel interference to KNWP, the Northwest Public Broadcasting transmitter at Port Angeles. In May 2000, Northern Sound offered to transfer the 91.7 construction permit to Skagit Valley College to move KSVR there and solve the interference problem. The original KSVR license was then transferred to Washington State and relaunched as KMWS in November 2002, at which time the KSVR intellectual unit moved to 91.7. In 2007, KMWS moved to 89.7 MHz at higher power and began broadcasting in HD Radio.

The M in the KMWS call letters honors WSU alumnus and Skagit County native Edward R. Murrow.

References

External links

MWS
MWS
NPR member stations